Shin'ichirō Ikebe ( Ikebe Shin'ichirō; born September 15, 1943 in Mito, Ibaraki) is a Japanese composer of contemporary classical music.

Overviews 
He has written the scores for many films by Akira Kurosawa and other Japanese film directors, including Kagemusha (1980), MacArthur's Children (1984), Kurosawa's Dreams (1990), Rhapsody in August (1991), Madadayo (1993), and Warm Water Under a Red Bridge (2001).

Biography
He studied composition with Tomojirō Ikenouchi, Akio Yashiro, and Akira Miyoshi at the Tokyo National University of Fine Arts and Music, obtaining a master's degree in 1971.  He serves as a professor at the Tokyo College of Music.  He had several awards up to 2004, such as Excellence at the Salzburg TV Opera, The Italian Broadcasting Corporation, that is, RAI, The International Emmy Award, the Otaka Award, Broadcasting Culture Award, Yoshio Sagawa incentive Award, Medal with Purple Ribbon.

Selected works
Symphony no. 3
Symphony no. 5 "Simplex"
Music to "Kagemusha"
War song
Spirit in the fields
Sanshuu Road
Dreams

List of works

Symphonies 
 Symphony No. 1, 1967
 Petite symphonie, 1969 (rev. 1973)
 Symphony No. 2 "Trias", 1979
 Symphony No. 3 "Ego phano", 1984
 Symphony No. 4, 1990
 Symphony No. 5 "Simplex", 1990
 Symphony No. 6 "On the Individual Coordinates", 1993
 Symphony No. 7 "To the Sympathy for a Drip", 1999
 Symphony No. 8 "The Earth/Prayer", 2013
 Symphony No. 9 for soprano, baritone and orchestra, 2013
 Symphony No. 10 "For the Coming Era", 2015

Orchestral works 
 Movement for Orchestra, 1964
 Construction, two pieces for orchestra, 1966
 Energeia for 60 musicians, 1970
 Haru-no-umi for Orchestra, 1980
 Elegiac Lines for strings, 1982
 Imagine for orchestra, 1983
 Overture for the Time of Flying Star, 1984
 Overture for the Coming of the New Spring, paraphrase of Antonio Vivaldi and homage to Maurice Ravel, 1986
 Mandolin Mandoriale for mandolin orchestra, 1986
 Overture or Nile, 1988
 Overture "Mito", 1989
 River/Shout, symphonic piece, 1988
 Fantasy of Kyushu, symphonic piece, 1989
 Spontaneous Ignition for orchestra, 1989
 Overture for the song lovers, 1990
 Hokkai, symphonic piece, 1992
 Fantasy of Ryukyu, symphonic piece, 1993
 Mountain/Fragrant, symphonic piece, 1994
 The Glossy-Leaved Forest for strings, 1995
 Les bois tristes for orchestra, 1998
 The Echo of K Ai for orchestra, 1999
 Saka-Sakasa-Kasa, march concertante, 2000–02
 Prelude for Celebration, 2000
 The Origin of Water for orchestra, 2001
 Fanfare for the Tokyo Symphony Orchestra, 2002
 Fan-Faring for orchestra and mixed choir, 2002
 The Chronicle of 3776 Meters for orchestra, 2003
 After the Dreams, 2003
 Tanada I for orchestra, 2004
 The Warmth in Your Home for orchestra, 2004
 Falling Particles of... for chamber orchestra, 2005
 Nakatsugawa, 2005
 Ouju Gaga for gagaku, 2009
 Perennial Prelude, 2010
 Prelude for the Next Times, 2011

Works for wind ensemble 
 I hear the piano... Amadeus for two wind groups and organ, 1983
 Landscape for wind ensemble, 1989
 The Times of Quickening for wind ensemble, 1999
 Fanfare for the Coming Era for brass octet, 2015

Concertante works 
 Piano Concerto No. 1, 1967
 Dimorphism for organ and orchestra, 1974
 Quadrants for Japanese instruments and orchestra, 1974
 Violin Concerto, 1981
 Echigo-Jishi for sangen (shamisen) and orchestra, 1983
 Piano Concerto No. 2, 1987
 Cello Concerto "Almost a tree", 1996
 Bassoon Concerto "The License of Blaze", 1999-2004
 Flute Concerto "Sitting on a Sand, Face to Face", 2003
 Sangen (Shamisen) Concerto "As a Shade Tree", 2005
 Mandolin Mandoriale 2 for mandolin orchestra, 2006
 Harp Concerto "Luminescence on Ice", 2007
 Piano Concerto (for left hand) No. 3 "To a West Wind", 2013

Operas, cantatas and musicals 
 The Death Goddess, opera, 1971
 A Red Shoes, musical drama, 1975
 The Silence, musical drama for radio, 1977
 The Adventure of Pinocchio, musical, 1981
 On ne badine pas avec l'amour, musical, 1982
 Hoichi, the earless, opera, 1982
 Never ending story, musical, 1984
 Taro in the Wonder Woods, musical, 1985
 The Window, musical drama, 1986
 Chichibu-Bansho, opera, 1988
 Carmen, Capriccio Based on Georges Bizet, 1989
 For a Beautiful Star, cantata, 1990
 Watatsumi no iroko no miya, cantata, 1990
 Shin, Zen, Bi, cantata, 1994
 Oshichi, opera, 1995
 The Down/Ocean, Mountain, Rivers and Human Beings, cantata, 1996
 Dugong's Lullaby, opera, 1996
 Freezing Field... Glaring, cantata, 1996
 Yobikawasu sanga, oratorio, 2001
 Takagami, opera, 2001
 The forrests are living, musical, 2003
 Kotsuru, opera, 2003
 Onihachi, opera, 2004
 Sagan Rhapsody, 2004
 The Path of Spiritual Growth, cantata, 2006
 Cursor, musical, 2007
 The Bridge, cantata, 2007
 Umi yo. haha yo, cantata, 2008
 Rokumeikan (鹿鳴館), opera, 2010, premiered by the New National Theatre Tokyo in 2010

Ballets and dance music 
 Kusabi, dance music, 1972
 Creature, ballet, 1974
 Oshichi, She Is in the Flame, dance music, 1978
 Takeru, dance music, 1979
 Cleopatra—Her Love and Death, ballet, 1983
 Mobile et Immobile, ballet, 1984
 Mizu-kuguru monogatari, dance music, 1984
 To-to taru, ichiitai-sui, ballet, 1986
 For the Earth, dance music, 1989

Film scores 
 Vengeance is Mine (director: Shōhei Imamura, 1979)
 Kagemusha (director: Akira Kurosawa, 1980)
 Himeyuri no Tō (director: Imai Tadashi, 1982)
 The Ballad of Narayama (director: Shōhei Imamura, 1983)
 MacArthur's Children (director: Masahiro Shinoda, 1984)
 Dreams (director: Akira Kurosawa, 1990)
 Takeshi - Childhood Days (director: Masahiro Shinoda, 1990)
 Rhapsody in August (director: Akira Kurosawa, 1991)
 Madadayo (director: Akira Kurosawa, 1993)
 The Eel (director: Shōhei Imamura, 1997)
 Spy Sorge (director: Masahiro Shinoda, 2003)
 Baruto no Gakuen (director: Masanobu Deme, 2006)
 Glory to the Filmmaker! (director: Takeshi Kitano, 2007),

Television scores 
 Future Boy Conan (director: Hayao Miyazaki, 1978)

Honours 
Medal with Purple Ribbon (2004)
Person of Cultural Merit (2018)
Order of the Rising Sun, 3rd Class, Gold Rays with Neck Ribbon (2022)

References
 Itoh, Tatsuhiko. 2001. "Ikebe, Shin′ichirō". The New Grove Dictionary of Music and Musicians, second edition, edited by Stanley Sadie and John Tyrrell. London: Macmillan Publishers.

External links

Zen-On Music – Ikebe biography, list of works, discography
Biography

1943 births
Japanese classical composers
Japanese contemporary classical composers
Japanese film score composers
Japanese male classical composers
Japanese male film score composers
Japanese opera composers
Living people
Male opera composers
Musicians from Ibaraki Prefecture
People from Mito, Ibaraki
Persons of Cultural Merit
Recipients of the Medal with Purple Ribbon
Recipients of the Order of the Rising Sun, 3rd class
Tokyo University of the Arts alumni